Trevor Johnson (born January 25, 1982 in Trail, British Columbia) is a retired Canadian-born Italian professional ice hockey player who last played for Manchester Storm of the Elite Ice Hockey League. He participated at the 2010 IIHF World Championship as a member of the Italian National men's ice hockey team.

Career statistics

Regular season and Playoffs

International

References

External links

1982 births
Asiago Hockey 1935 players
Bolzano HC players
Canadian ice hockey defencemen
Cleveland Barons (2001–2006) players
Hershey Bears players
Ice hockey people from British Columbia
Italian ice hockey defencemen
Living people
Kassel Huskies players
Kootenay Ice players
Manchester Storm (2015–) players
Muskegon Fury players
Peoria Rivermen (ECHL) players
Seattle Thunderbirds players
South Carolina Stingrays players
Sportspeople from Trail, British Columbia
Ritten Sport players
Tri-City Americans players
Canadian expatriate ice hockey players in England
Canadian expatriate ice hockey players in Italy
Canadian expatriate ice hockey players in Germany
Canadian expatriate ice hockey players in the United States
Naturalised citizens of Italy
Italian expatriate ice hockey people
Italian expatriate sportspeople in Germany
Italian expatriate sportspeople in England